Umberto Pineschi (born Trieste, Venezia Giulia, Italy) is a Professor Emeritus of the State Conservatory of Music "G. Rossini" of Pesaro, and Professor Emeritus of Conservatory of Music "G.B. Martini" of Bologna, He was Director of the municipal school of music "T. Mabellini" of Pistoia up to 2015.

He contributed to the strengthening of cultural exchanges between Japan and Italy, thanks to organ music education. In 2009, he was awarded the Order of the Rising Sun, Gold Rays with Neck Ribbon, by the government of Japan. He worked with Hiroshi Tsuji.
He supported the International Organ Festival Of Uruguay.

Discography
Organi Storici D'Italia CD  (Liuwe Tamminga, March 1999)

References

Italian organists
Male organists
Recipients of the Order of the Rising Sun, 3rd class
Living people
Academic staff of the Conservatorio Giovanni Battista Martini
21st-century organists
21st-century Italian male musicians
Year of birth missing (living people)